Victor John Matthews (29 January 1941 – 28 November 2004) was an Irish-Canadian classical scholar. He is known for his publication of text and commentaries on Panyassis of Halikarnassos (1974) and Antimachus of Colophon (1996). He also wrote several articles on Hellenistic Poetry and Ancient Sport.

Matthews was born in Derry, Northern Ireland and studied at Foyle College, Queen's University Belfast, and McMaster University. He taught at the University of Guelph from 1965 until his death.

References

1941 births
2004 deaths
Canadian classical scholars
People educated at Foyle College
Alumni of Queen's University Belfast
McMaster University alumni
Northern Ireland emigrants to Canada
Writers from Derry (city)
Academic staff of the University of Guelph